Mugera is an administrative ward in Buhigwe District  of Kigoma Region of Tanzania. In 2016 the Tanzania National Bureau of Statistics report there were 17,279 people in the ward, from 15,698 in 2012.

Villages / neighborhoods 
The ward has 2 villages and 3 hamlets.

 Mugera Mugera
 Kishina
 Majengo
 Luyange
 Katundu

References

Buhigwe District
Wards of Kigoma Region